Bachir Baccour (born 19 May 1979), better known by his stage name Tunisiano, is a Tunisian rapper living in France. Prior to pursuing a solo career, he was a member of M, Sniper and other rap groups.

Career 
Bachir Baccour's parents were born in Menzel Bouzelfa, Tunisia. Interested very early with hip hop music, he started writing lyrics at 13.

Beginnings
Member of M group
In 1995, he joined M Group. He was just 16. M Group released a number of maxis and a mini album.
Others
He was also part of the French rappers collective named Comité where he found Aketo, and met Scheol (later known as Blacko), and created the band Personnalité Suspecte. In 1997, he was also approached by the record label Desh Musique took part in a major event Hip Hop Folies at La Rochelle.

Member of Sniper
In 2000, he joined Sniper who released Du rire aux larmes. The band were involved in legal problems, and so were obliged to cancel the tour. In 2003, Sniper released their second album Gravé dans la roche again with Sniper. Blacko stopped rapping and moved to Ragga / Dancehall and there were rumors of a band split. However they managed to release a third album Trait pour trait in 2006.

Tunisiano also published La France, Itinéraire d'une polémique with journalist and writer Olivier Cachin, talking about conflicts with extreme right-wing groups.

In 2007, he also appeared in Aketo's album Cracheur 2 Venin.

Solo
Tunisiano, after publishing solo materials on various rap compilations (like Illégal Muzik) and music for the film Taxi 4, in 2008 he released his first complete solo album, Le regard des gens. The song Je porte plainte created conflict among allegations that he had taken it from the song Ever Dream (from Finnish band Nightwish) without taking their consent. Nuclear Blast Records open a lawsuit for plagiarism.

Discography

M Group albums 
1995 : Fidèle au rap
1997 : Tu disais quoi?
1998 : Rapide comme un serpent, 2ème Morsure
1999 : Graine de Star

Sniper albums
2001: Du rire aux larmes
2003: Gravé dans la Roche
2006: Trait pour trait
2009: C'est pas fini
2011: À toute épreuve
2018: Personnalité suspectes

Solo albums

Singles

Other non charting singles
2008 : "Nos rues"
2008 : "Le regard des gens"
2008 : "Je porte plainte"
2009 : "Marlich"
2009 : "Citoyens du monde" (feat Zaho)

Featured in

Collaborations 

1999: Sniper - Association de scarla on 'Power of unity mixtape
1999: Sniper feat Prodige - Même pas 20 piges on Premiere Classe Vol. 1 mixtape
1999: Sniper - Exercice de style on B.O.S.S. mixtape
2000: K.Special feat Sniper - Les porcs on K.Special album Cause à effet2001: Sniper feat Aben - Mission suicide on the compilation Mission suicide2001: Sniper feat Tandem, Bakar and Aben - Niquer le système on the compilation Sachons dire NON Vol.22002: Sniper - Fierté d'honneur sur la mixtape Samouraï2002: TNT feat Sniper - On dit quoi on the TNT album Felxible comme un roseau2003: Sniper feat Kazkami and Dadoo - Victimes des circonstances on the Insurrection mixtape
2004: Sniper feat Bakar - On revient choquer la France on the On revient choquer la France mixtape
2004: Sniper - Live Radio on Session freestyle mixtape
2005: Tandem feat Tunisiano, Kazkami, Faf Larage, Lino, Diam's and Kery James - Le jugement on the Tandem album C'est toujours pour ceux qui savent2005: Sniper - Encore on the Rap Performance mixtape
2005: El Tunisiano - Gravé dans l'instru on the Ma conscience mixtape
2005: Tunisiano feat Sinik, Kool Shen, Zoxea, Nysay and Iron Sy - Ma conscience on the Ma conscience mixtape
2005: Tunisiano - Zinc on the compilation Patrimoine du ghetto2005: Bakar feat Sniper - On revient choquer la France on the Bakar street CD Pour les quartiers2006: L'Skadrille feat Sniper - Bons moments on the L'Skadrille album Nos vies2006: Sinik feat Tunisiano - Un monde meilleur on the Sinik album Sang froid2006: Sniper feat Scred Connexion - Sirocco on the compilation Police2006: Tunisiano - Mes mots on the compilation Illegal Radio2006: Apash feat Tunisiano - Un bon son pour une bonne cause on Apash' street CD Un bon son pour une bonne cause2007: Sniper - Quoi qu'il arrive and Rien à foutre both on the film album Taxi 42007: Sniper - Le goût du sang on the film album Scorpion2007: Two Naze feat Sniper - L'angoisse d'une mère on the Two Naze album C'est de la balle2007: Tunisiano feat Taro OG, La Meche, Mood and Alonso - Morts pour rien on the Morts pour rien mixtape
2007: Sniper feat Jérome Prister - Say you'll be Remix2007: Six Coups Mc feat Sniper and Sefyu - Style certifié on the Six Coups Mc street CD A prendre ou à laisser2008: Zaho feat Tunisiano - La roue tourne on Zaho album Dima2008: Tunisiano - Arrête-moi si tu peux on the film album Mesrine2008: Tunisiano feat Reda Taliani - Ça passe ou ça casse on the compilation Rai'N'B fever Vol.32009: Kamelancien feat Mac Kregor, Ol Kainry, Tunisiano and Jango Jack - T'était Ou? Remix on Kamelancien album 2eme frisson de la vérité2009: Tunisiano - Est-ce que j'ai la côte on the compilation Les yeux dans la banlieue Vol.22009: Tunisiano feat AKA - Maillot jaune on the compilation Punchline Street beat show2009: Tunisiano feat Aketo and TLF - In compilation Talents fâchés 42009: Tunisiano feat Cheb Bilal - 1001 problèmes on the compilation Maghreb United2009: Tunisiano feat GSX - Ca va le faire2010: Youssoupha feat Tunisiano, Ol' Kainry, Médine and Sinik - Apprentissage Remix2010: Kalash l'Afro feat. Tunisiano - On fait la différence on the Kalash l'Afro mixtape Que du seum2010: Six Coups MC feat. Tunisiano & TLF - Définition de ma dalle on the Six Coups MC album Un pied dans le bitume2010: Aka feat. Tunisiano - Maillot jaune on the Aka album La maladie de la haine2010: Mister You feat Tunisiano - Ca sort du Zoogataga on the Mister You album MDR : Mec De Rue2010: Alkpote feat. Tunisiano - Mise à mort programmé2011: Tunisiano feat M.A.S - Appelle moi on Tunisiano album Une Minute de Silence2011: Sniper (Tunisiano and Aketo) and Reda Taliani - Arabia (after events in Tunisia)
2011: Sniper, Sinik, Rim'K, Médine, Mokless, Haroun, Leck, L'Algerino, Bakar, Mister You and Reda Taliani - Arabia Remix All Stars2011: Sniper feat. Soprano - J'te parle2011: Axel Tony feat. Tunisiano - Avec Toi2012: Dernier Mc (Remix) - Kery James
2012: "Paname Boss" - La Fouine feat. Sniper, Niro, Youssoupha, Canardo, Fababy & Sultan - (in La Fouine album Drôle de parcours)
2013: Dernier MC Remix Partie 1 - Kery James feat. Lino, Tunisiano, REDK, Médine, 2e France, Scylla, Ladea, Fababy & Orelsan
2013: "Coupable" - Scylla feat R.E.D.K. & Tunisiano - (in Scylla album Abysses2014: "My Bled" - DJ Kayz feat. Tunisiano & Cheb Houssem (in DJ Kayz album Paris Oran NY)
2014: "Amane Amane" - L'Algérino feat. Tunisiano (in L'Algérino album Aigle Royal)
2021: "Ballade à deux" feat. Inès Reg - (in soundtrack of film Je te veux, moi non plus'')

Personal life 
Tunisiano has been known in French kickboxing circuits, as well as overseas. Among everything, he has released a "C'est Qui? C'est Khider!" single for the multiple champion and future participant of "La Ferme Célébrités en Afrique", Farid Khider, as well as appeared as a cornerman for the latter when he contested for World Kickboxing Network European title in Minsk, Belarus in 2005.

References

External links
Tunisiano Official site on Skyrock Music
Tunisiano Official MySpace website
Tunisiano artist page on Rap2France.com 
Tunisiano interview and mini-concert - meeting at Fnac
Tunisiano music videos on Dailymotion

1979 births
Living people
French rappers
French people of Tunisian descent
Rappers from Val-d'Oise